Bonipogonius fujitai is a species of beetle in the family Cerambycidae, and the only species in the genus Bonipogonius. It was described by Kusama in 1974.

References

Desmiphorini
Beetles described in 1974
Monotypic Cerambycidae genera